Selimaj is an Albanian surname. Notable people with the surname include:

Dardan Selimaj (born 1984), Kosovar journalist, producer, and music theorist
Erind Selimaj (born 1989), Albanian football player 

Albanian-language surnames